William Ka Ming Lau (born 22 March 1950) is a senior scientist at the Earth System Science Interdisciplinary Center, a research center at the University of Maryland and an Adjunct Professor of the Department of Atmospheric and Oceanic Sciences at the University of Maryland. A physicist by training, his research spans over 4 decades covering a wide range of topics in climate dynamics, tropical meteorology, ocean-atmosphere coupling, aerosol-water cycle interactions, and climate variability and change. Lau conducted pioneering research on atmospheric teleconnection, and the global monsoon climate system. He discovered the aerosol-monsoon regional feedback mechanism, i.e., the Elevated Heat Pump (EHP) effect that strongly modulate climate change in Asian monsoon regions. He was the senior author of a popular research reference book, “Intraseasonal Variability in the Atmosphere-Ocean Climate System”. As of November 2020, he has coauthored 297 refereed papers, with total citation = 33,932, h-index=101.

Education
Lau was born in Macau, Special Administrative Region (SAR) China.  He received his early education at a grade school run by the Jesuit China missions.  In 1960, his family emigrated to Hong Kong, SAR, China, where he completed his high school education in New Method College. He received his BSc (Mathematics and Physics) in 1972; BSc Honors (Applied Mathematics) in 1973  from the University of Hong Kong; PhD in Atmospheric Sciences in 1977, from the University of Washington in Seattle, Washington.

Academic career
After graduating from the University of Washington, he was recruited as assistant professor at the Naval Postgraduate School (1978-1980). In 1981, he joined the NASA Goddard Space Flight Center (GSFC) as a civil servant scientist.  At GSFC, he rose through the ranks serving as the Head of the Climate and Radiation Branch (1991-2000), Chief of the Laboratory for Atmospheres (2001-2010), and the Deputy Director for Science, NASA Goddard Space Flight Center Earth Science Division (2011-2014).   In 2015, he retired from GSFC, and joined ESSIC.  Lau frequently visits international research and academic institutions around the world to present invited lectures, keynote presentations in scientific meetings, and public speeches to promote awareness on impacts of climate change on regional weather extremes. He has served on numerous national and international science steering groups, committees and review panels, including as Chair of Climate Variability (CLIVAR) monsoon panel, and member of the science steering group of Global Energy and Water Exchanges (GEWEX), World Climate Research Programme (WCRP).  He was a coauthor of the chapter on regional effects of climate change of the Intergovernmental Panel on Climate Change (IPCC), and a U.S. National Academy of Sciences report on “Himalayan Glaciers: Climate Change, Water Resources and Security. In 2014-16, he served as the President of the Atmospheric Science Section of the American Geophysical Union

Awards and honors

Lau has received many awards and honors for his research accomplishments and leadership, including:

 Fellow of the American Association for the Advancement of Science (AAAS), 2020
 Axford Distinguished Lecturer Award, Asia Oceania Geophysical Society (2017)
 Honorary Professor, Peking University(2016) 
 Bromery Lecturer, Johns Hopkins University (2015)
 Honorary Professor from the School of Energy and Environment, City University of Hong Kong (2011)
 Distinguished Alumni Award, Hong Kong University (2010)
 Fellow of the American Geophysical Union (2007)
 Fellow of the American Meteorological Society (2005)
 Distinguished Meteorologist Award, Hong Kong Observatory (2004) 
 Goddard Senior Fellow
 NASA William Nordberg Award (1999)
 Clarence Leroy Meisinger Award, American Meteorological Society
 The John Lindsay Award for Science
 William Nordberg Medal in Earth Science (1999)
 President, the Chinese-American Ocean-Atmosphere Association (1991-1992)
 NASA Exceptional Achievement Medal (1991), Goddard Senior Fellow
 American Meteorological Society Clarence Leroy Meisinger Award (1988) “for outstanding contributions enhancing our understanding of atmospheric low frequency oscillations”
 “Most Promising Young Scientist”, Tenki, the bulletin journal of the Meteorological Society of Japan (1988)
 John Lindsay Award (1987), NASA/GSFC highest award in Science
 “Top ten science and technology talents in the Washington Area”, selected by Washington Technology (1987)
 Graduate with First Class Honors, BSc (1972), and BSc Special (1973), University of Hong Kong

References

External links 

1950 births
Living people
American meteorologists
American people of Macanese descent
NASA astrophysicists
Fellows of the American Geophysical Union
Fellows of the American Association for the Advancement of Science
Alumni of the University of Hong Kong
University of Washington alumni
Naval Postgraduate School faculty
University of Maryland, College Park faculty
Macau scientists